Senator Bryan may refer to:

Members of the United States Senate
Nathan Philemon Bryan (1872–1935), U.S. Senator from Florida from 1911 to 1917
Richard Bryan (born 1937), U.S. Senator from Nevada from 1989 to 2001
William James Bryan (1876–1908), U.S. Senator from Florida from 1907 to 1908

United States state senate members
Charles Henry Bryan (1822–1877), California State Senate
James W. Bryan (1874–1956), Washington State Senate
Silas Bryan (1822–1880), Illinois State Senate

See also
Senator O'Brien (disambiguation)
Senator Bryant (disambiguation)